The 1993 NCAA Division I-AA football season, part of college football in the United States organized by the National Collegiate Athletic Association at the Division I-AA level, began in August 1993, and concluded with the 1993 NCAA Division I-AA Football Championship Game on December 18, 1993, at Marshall University Stadium in Huntington, West Virginia. The Youngstown State Penguins won their second I-AA championship, defeating the Marshall Thundering Herd by a score of 17−5. It was the third consecutive year that Marshall and Youngstown State faced off in the I-AA title game.

Conference changes and new programs
A 1991 NCAA rule change required athletic programs maintain all of their sports at the same division level by the 1993 season. As such, many Division I programs with football teams at the Division II and Division III levels were forced to upgrade their programs to the Division I-AA level.
The rule change directly led to the establishment of the Pioneer Football League, a non-scholarship football conference at the Division I-AA level with six founding members, all formerly in Division III: Butler, Dayton, Drake, Evansville, San Diego, and Valparaiso.
It also led to the creation of the American West Conference, initially a football-only conference at the Division I-AA level with five founding members, all formerly in Division II: UC Davis, Cal Poly, Cal State Northridge, Sacramento State, and Southern Utah.
The Metro Atlantic Athletic Conference, an existing Division I conference, also began sponsoring football in order to accommodate these new I-AA football programs.

Note: The UC Davis Aggies, although a member of the new American West Conference, were listed in Division II polls, and participated in the Division II postseason.

Conference standings

Conference champions

Postseason

NCAA Division I-AA playoff bracket
Only the top four teams in the field were seeded, with the NCAA placing others teams in the bracket to avoid early round matchups between teams from the same conference. This was the first season that the NCAA did not use an in-house poll process for I-AA ranking purposes; independent polling by The Sports Network wire service was used. The site of the title game, Marshall University Stadium, had been predetermined months earlier.

* Next to team name denotes host institution

* Next to score denotes overtime period

Source:

References